Alejo Martín Sauras (born June 29, 1979 in Palma de Mallorca), is a Spanish actor who is best known as Raúl Martinez in Los Serrano.

Biography
Sauras was born in Palma de Mallorca, Mallorca but he spend his childhood in Madrid. Sauras studied aviation electronics for a while but he left his studies to pursue acting. Along with his acting studies, he studied Japanese, which gave him two theatre roles afterward.  He also studied dance with Sue Samuels of the Broadway Dance Center in 2001.  Sauras begin to get small roles in television series and his breakthrough happened through the TV series Al salir de clase (1997–2001) where Sauras played a young gay man, Santi. Later, Sauras had roles in Y decirte una estupidez, por ejemplo, te quiero (2000) and Diario de una becaria (2003). He also made guest roles in television series. From 2003 to 2008 Sauras played Raúl Martínez in Los Serrano

Awards
In 2007, Sauras won a "best actor" prize for his role in the movie Bienvenido a casa.

Filmography

Movies 
Mensaka (1998)
Y decirte alguna estupidez, por ejemplo, te quiero (2000)
La mujer de mi vida (2001)
Diario de una becaria (2003)
Atrapados TV movie (2003)
Mentiras TV movie (2005)
H6: Diario de un asesino (2005)
Bienvenido a casa (2006)
La habitación de Fermat (2007)
Café solo o con ellas (2007)
Lo que tiene el otro (2007)
Sexykiller, morirás por ella (2007)
Mentiras y gordas (2008)
Los abrazos rotos (2009)
 Solo Química (2015)
 El jugador de ajedrez (2017), como Javier Sánchez

 Television Al salir de clase (1999–2000) as SantiJavier ya no vive solo (2003) as ÓscarLos Serrano (2003–2008) as Raúl MartínezAcusados (2010) as Pablo Alonso.
 14 de abril. La República (2011–2019) as Jesús Prado.Estoy vivo (2017–) as El Enlace

 Theatre La Ínsula Barataria (1996)Manuke Mura (1996, in Japanese)Tonari No Ojiisan (1997, in Japanese)La Gallina Ciega'' (2002)

References

External links
 
 

1979 births
Living people
People from Palma de Mallorca
Spanish male stage actors
Spanish male television actors
Spanish male film actors
20th-century Spanish male actors
21st-century Spanish male actors